Frank M. Goodykoontz (16 April 1842 – 24 November 1898) was an American politician.

Goodykoontz was born in Anderson, Indiana on 16 April 1842. He and his parents moved to Waukon, Iowa, in 1856. He began practicing law aged 21, successively in Le Roy, Minnesota, Postville, Lime Springs, and Mason City, Iowa. Goodykoontz was elected to the Iowa Senate from Cerro Gordo County and assumed office as a Republican in January 1880, representing District 47 until his resignation in took effect in January 1882. Goodykoontz left Iowa for Chamberlain, South Dakota, where he continued the practice of law, and later settled in Mitchell. He was considered a potential Populist candidate for the 1897 United States Senate elections in South Dakota, which saw the reelection of incumbent James H. Kyle. Goodykoontz died in Mitchell on 24 November 1898.

References

1842 births
1898 deaths
19th-century American lawyers
Iowa lawyers
Minnesota lawyers
People from Mason City, Iowa
Republican Party Iowa state senators
South Dakota Populists
South Dakota lawyers
People from Chamberlain, South Dakota
People from Mitchell, South Dakota
People from Waukon, Iowa
People from Anderson, Indiana